Alick-Maud Pledge (1893–1949) was an English folk dance and gymnastics teacher in France.

Early life 
Alick-Maud Pledge (sometimes written as Maud Alick Pledge) was born in London.

Career in France 
Pledge moved to France in 1926 following the call of Jaques-Dalcroze, but became soon independent. In the New Education movement, she created the French associations Education and Movement and Friends of the Popular Dance. She popularized the Chapelloise, a folk dance, in France. She influenced Marcelle Albert, Marinette Aristow-Journoud and Jean-Michel Guilcher who carried on with teaching folk dances in France.

Personal life 
Pledge died in 1949, in her mid-fifties. Her gravesite is in Père Lachaise Cemetery in Paris.

References

Articles 
 « Mouvement, gymnastique et équilibre nerveux », in La Nouvelle Éducation, 1932, 3 articles pp. 9, 18 et 39.
 « La danse populaire », in La Nouvelle Éducation, 1935.

Publications 
 Jean-Philippe Saint-Martin. Les origines oubliées de la Gymnastique Volontaire entre les deux guerres mondiales. In SPORT ET GENRE (VOLUME 3) Apprentissage du genre et institutions éducatives. Lharmattan, 2006, 55–69.

External links 
 Miss Pledge (1893-1949) by Yves Guilcher
 Education et mouvement

English educational theorists
English emigrants to France
1893 births
1949 deaths